{{Infobox monarch
| image= Marthand Rao Holkar.png
| name =Marthand Rao Holkar
| succession       =  8th Holkar Maharaja of Indore
| caption =Marthand Rao Holkar
| title =Maharaja  (Ruler of Indore) | religion = Hinduism
| full name = Marthand Rao Holkar
| coronation = 17 January 1834, Indore
| birth_date = 1830
| birth_place =
| death_date = 2 June 1849
| death_place =Pune
| reign =  1833 - 1834
| successor =Hari Rao Holkar
| spouse =
| father = Bapu Sahib Holkar
| mother =
| issue =
}}

Maharajadhiraj Raja Rajeshwar Sawai Shri Marthand Rao Holkar VIII Bahadur or Marthand Rao Holkar (1830–1849) belonging to the Holkar dynasty of the Marathas was briefly the Maharaja of Indore (Holkar State) (1833–1834).

He was born in 1830, the eldest son of Shrimant Sardar Bapu Sahib Holkar. He was adopted in October 1833 by Gautama Bai Holkar and Krishna Bai Holkar, who were, respectively, the widow and mother of the deceased Maharaja Malhar Rao Holkar III.

 Gaddi 

Marthand Rao was installed on the throne (gaddi'') at Indore on 17 January 1834. The adoption, however, was not acceptable to the people, who regarded it as Gautama Bai's device for retaining power. The strong opposition of the public on 2 February 1834, led to the succession of Hari Rao Holkar. Subsequently, Marthand Rao was sent to the Deccan Plateau, where he was confined until his death at Poona on 2 June 1849.

See also 
 Holkar

References 

 Hira Lal Gupta, "INDORE SUCCESSIONS, 1833-34 & 1843", Proceedings of the Indian History Congress Vol. 18 (1955), pp. 243-251
 Henry Beveridge, A Comprehensive History of India, Civil, Military and Social, vol 3, London: Blackie, 1865, 220 et sup
 C U Aitchinson, A Collection of Treaties, Engagements, and Sanads Relating to India and Neighbouring Countries, vol 4. Calcutta: Government of India, 1893, 157

1830 births
1849 deaths
Maharajas of Indore